The Liberties ( or occasionally ) is an area in central Dublin, Ireland, located in the southwest of the inner city. Formed from various areas of special manorial jurisdiction, separate from the main city government, it is one of Dublin's most historic working class neighbourhoods. The area was traditionally associated with the River Poddle, market traders and local family-owned businesses, as well as the Guinness brewery, whiskey distilling, and, historically, the textiles industry and tenement housing.

Etymology 
The name derives from manorial jurisdictions dating from the arrival of the Anglo-Normans in the 12th century. They were lands united to the city, but still preserving their own jurisdiction (hence "liberties"). The most important of these liberties were the Liberty of St. Sepulchre, under the Archbishop of Dublin, and the Liberty of Thomas Court and Donore belonging to the Abbey of St. Thomas the Martyr (later called the Earl of Meath's Liberty). The modern Liberties area lies within the former boundaries of these two jurisdictions, between the river Liffey to the north, St. Patrick's Cathedral to the east, Warrenmount to the south and the St. James's Hospital campus to the west.

History

Historical location 
These two liberties are mentioned in Allen's Register of 1529, but without describing their exact location. After the dissolution of the monasteries by Henry VIII the liberties of Thomas Court and Donore was granted to William Brabazon, ancestor of the Earls of Meath. In 1579 the city of Dublin claimed the abbey to be within the jurisdiction and liberty of the city, but they lost their case. From then on the head of the liberty was the Earl of Meath. The family lent its name to places and streets in the district e.g. the Meath Market, the Meath Hospital and Meath Street. They also named Brabazon Row, Brabazon Street and Ardee Street (they were Barons Ardee since 1616).

In 1728 Charles Brooking published a detailed map, the Map of the City and Suburbs of Dublin, which contained a description of the boundaries of the liberties. The Manor of St. Sepulchre boundaries stretched from Bishop St. to St. Stephen's Green, along Harcourt Street to Donnybrook, across Rathgar to Harold's Cross and back along Clanbrassil Street to Patrick Street. The Earl of Meath's liberty ran west along The Coombe to Ardee St., turning north towards Echlin St. then along James's St. to Meath St., then through various smaller streets to Ash St. and back to the Coombe.

In 1837 the Ordnance Survey started developing their maps, and that of Dublin published in 1840 showed all the liberties, from the smallest (Christ Church Liberty, one acre and two roods) to the largest (the Earl of Meath's Liberty, 380 acres).

Privileges 
In return for the support of the ruler of the liberty, or to alleviate certain hardships suffered by Englishmen or the church in Ireland, privileges were granted to the rulers of the liberties at various times and by various kings of England. For example, these allowed the liberty of St. Sepulchre to have its own courts of justice (Courts Leet, Courts Baron and a Court of Record, where it was allowed to try all crimes except "forestalling, rape, treasure-trove and arson"), free customs, freedom from certain taxes and services, impose their own fines, have their own coroners, rights of salvage, maintain their own fairs and markets, regulate weights and measures, etc.

These rights and privileges ended in 1840.

Historical developments 
Many places in The Liberties still have connections with a turbulent past in which political upheaval or dire poverty were the order of the day. In the 17th century, parts of them became wealthy districts, when the weaving crafts of the immigrant Huguenots had a ready market around the present day Meath Street Market, and a healthy export trade.

17th and 18th centuries 
In the late 17th century development started in order to house the weavers who were moving into the area. Woollen manufacture was set up by settlers from England, while many Huguenots took up silk weaving, using skills they had acquired in their home country, France. They constructed their own traditional style of house, Dutch Billies, with gables that faced the street. Thousands of weavers became employed in the Coombe, Pimlico, Spitalfields and Weavers' Square.

However, English woollen manufacturers felt threatened by the Irish industry, and heavy duties were imposed on Irish wool exports. The Navigation Act was passed to prevent the Irish from exporting to the whole colonial market, then in 1699 the English government passed the Wool Act which prevented export to any country whatsoever, which effectively put an end to the industry in the Liberties.

A weavers' hall was built by the Weavers' Guild in the Lower Coombe in 1682. In 1745 a new hall was provided, financed by the Huguenot, David Digges La Touche. In 1750 the Guild erected a statue of George II on the front of their hall "as a mark of their sincere loyalty". The hall was demolished in 1965.

In the eighteenth century a revival took place, based on importation of Spanish wool, helped from 1775 by the Royal Dublin Society, but the events of 1798 and 1803, in which many weavers in the Liberties took part, and the economic decline that set in after the Act of Union, prevented any further growth in this industry in the Liberties.

Similarly, the successful growth of the silk and poplin industries, which was supported by the Royal Dublin Society in the second half of the 18th century, was hindered by an act passed by the Irish government in 1786, which prevented the society from supporting any house where Irish silk goods were sold. When war was declared against France under Napoleon and raw materials were difficult to obtain, the silk weavers suffered greatly. The final blow came in the 1820s when the British government did away with the tariffs imposed upon imported silk products.

From this time on, the fate of the Liberties was sealed and most of the once-prosperous houses became poverty-stricken tenements housing the unemployed and destitute.

19th century 
The Tenter House was erected in 1815 in Cork Street, financed by Thomas Pleasants. Before this the poor weavers of the Liberties had either to suspend work in rainy weather or use the alehouse fire and thus were (as Wright expresses it) "exposed to great distress, and not unfrequently reduced either to the hospital or the gaol." The Tenter House was a brick building 275 feet long, three storeys high, and with a central cupola. It had a form of central heating powered by four furnaces, and provided a place for weavers to stretch their material in bad weather.

Part of the area was redeveloped into affordable housing and parkland by the Iveagh Trust, the Dublin Artisans Dwellings Company and the City Council in the early to mid twentieth century. The appalling slums, dire poverty and hazardous dereliction have now been wiped away, and only a few scattered pockets remain to be demolished.

The Ordnance Survey recorded the following areas within the county of the city of Dublin in the 1830s:

In 1875 a fire broke out in a malt house and warehouse that caused 13 casualties entirely due to alcohol poisoning from the whiskey that flowed through the streets. The lack of significantly more casualties is attributed to the fact that one of the first buildings to be caught in the blaze was a pigsty that sent screaming livestock through the streets to warn residents.

Culture 

The Liberties holds a range of cultural centres, and forms part of the wider Dublin 8 area, home to five of Ireland's top visitor attractions, with the Guinness Storehouse alone accounting for 1.2 million annual visits.

Thomas Street is home to the country's largest art college, the National College of Art and Design (NCAD). The college was founded in 1746 as a private drawing school, and has become a national institution educating over 1,500 day and evening students. As a constituent college of University College Dublin, NCAD degrees and awards are validated by UCD.

The Liberties feature a number of art galleries, including that at NCAD, along with private sector projects such as Basic Space, Pallas Projects, Cross Gallery, and the Jam Art Factory. Nearby is the Irish Museum of Modern Art in the Royal Hospital Kilmainham.

Entertainment 

The Liberties hosts regular performances in theatres, bars, music venues and night clubs. Music venues include Vicar Street, on Thomas Street, hosting comedy, drama and concerts, with capacity for 1,500, and The Thomas House, specialised in punk, rock and reggae music.

The Liberties Festival 
The Liberties Festival is one of Ireland's oldest festivals. Starting around 1970, it has grown to include sporting and community events, and a multi-cultural and arts programme encompassing visual art, film, dance, comedy, literature and music. Most of the events held during the festival are free. The Festival is a SICCDA project and is supported by DCC, the local community, and a range of private sponsors including Diageo.

The Liberties Brewers Cup 
The Liberties Brewers Cup is an annual competition for coffee lovers. It was established in 2017 by Marcin Kotwicki, former Head Barista of Legit Coffee Co. on Meath Street, and a member of the Specialty Coffee Association-Irish Chapter.
Each year 15 competitors take part in the black coffee brewing challenge. 
The competition is open to spectators who can enjoy the barista's brewing skills but also can socialise with other coffee lovers. To help them with that, food, beers, and much coffee are provided by the sponsors. Also, music is played by local DJs.
This year the Fourth edition of Liberties Brewers Cup is set for 4 October 2020 at the Vandal Cafe and Restaurant on Thomas Street, The Liberties, Dublin 8.

Economy

Brewing and distilling 
The Liberties is the home of the iconic Guinness brewery, which continues to attract investment from parent company Diageo, including €130 million on the development of Brewhouse No. 4 on Victoria Quay. The Guinness Storehouse, Ireland's most-visited paid visitor attraction, brings in 1.6 million annual visitors.

Further, having seen most local breweries and distilleries close since the late 1800s, the area is currently undergoing a renaissance as a centre for craft distilling and brewing in Dublin. Teelings Whiskey have opened their new distillery and visitor centre in Newmarket, the first new Irish whiskey distillery to develop in Dublin since the 19th century, while significant investment has also been made in The Liberties by the Dublin Whiskey Company, Alltech, Galway Bay Brewery, 5 Lamps Brewery and others. The Pearse Lyons distillery opened on St James's Street in September 2017 while the Dublin Liberties Distillery on Mill Street is due to open in 2018. The Beer Market, the only bar in Ireland which serves only beer, opened on Cornmarket in April 2015. It is also home to the Dublin Liberties Distillery a state-of-the-art craft Irish whiskey distillery which also hosts an exceptional visitor experience and brand home for Irish whiskeys. The distillery crafts 100% malted barley to be laid down for their whiskey brands, the award-winning Dubliner and Dublin Liberties whiskeys.

Retail 

Historically, The Liberties was home to some market areas. Today there are the Liberty Market on Meath Street, the fruit and vegetable markets during weekends on Thomas Street and Meath Street, and street vendors located throughout the area. There are future plans for further market areas, such as the redevelopment of the Iveagh Market on Francis Street. Newmarket, to the south of the area, hosts several other market events.

The Digital Hub 

The Digital Hub is a cluster of digital content and technology enterprises, located on a campus in the centre of The Liberties. Set up by the Government of Ireland in 2003, The Digital Hub is now home to 100 Irish and international businesses. The Digital Hub is Ireland's largest cluster of technology, internet and digital media companies.

Liberties Business Area Improvement Initiative 
The Liberties Business Area Improvement Initiative is a partnership between Dublin City Council and local businesses and stakeholders to transform the commercial heart of Dublin 8 through public and private sector investment, to create a more vibrant and attractive city neighbourhood. The website for the Initiative and for The Liberties area is http://libertiesdublin.ie.

Places of interest 
The Liberties features many landmarks and monuments, some dating to medieval times. One of the most notable of these is Christ Church Cathedral, the elder of the capital's two medieval cathedrals, the other being St Patrick's Cathedral.

Christ Church Cathedral 

Christ Church is the seat (cathedral) of the Archbishop of Dublin in the Church of Ireland. Although it is also claimed by the Roman Catholic archbishops of Dublin, in practise it has been the cathedral of only the Church of Ireland's Archbishop of Dublin since the English Reformation. The cathedral was founded in c. 1030 before the Normans rebuilt it in stone after their arrival into Ireland in 1169.

Saint Patrick's Cathedral 

Saint Patrick's Cathedral, founded in 1191, is the largest church in Ireland and Dublin's second Church of Ireland cathedral. Today Saint Patrick's is the location for a number of public national ceremonies, including Ireland's Remembrance Day, and graduation ceremonies for students of Dublin Institute of Technology, and is also a popular visitor attraction. Next to the cathedral is an urban park, St Patrick's Park, and nearby is the Cabbage Garden, a former cemetery linked to the cathedral, now also a public park.

Guinness Storehouse 
The Guinness Storehouse is Ireland's most visited paid tourist destination, with 1.6 million annual visits, and showcases the famous St. James's Gate Brewery. The Storehouse covers seven floors surrounding a glass atrium, shaped in the form of a pint of Guinness. The top floor houses the Gravity Bar, where visitors can view the Liberties and Dublin city.

John's Lane Church 
John's Lane Augustinian Church, located on Thomas Street, was designed by Edward Welby Pugin and opened in 1874. The 12 statues in the tower niches are the work of sculptor James Pearse, the father of Patrick and William Pearse. The church steeple is the highest in the city, standing at over 200 feet (61.0 m).

Teeling Whiskey Distillery 
In summer 2015, Teeling Whiskey opened a whiskey distillery and visitor centre in Newmarket. This is the first new Irish whiskey distillery to be developed in Dublin since the 19th century. Guided tours and whiskey tasting are now offered to visitors.

Dubline 
The Liberties is a key part of The Dubline, a €3 million investment by Fáilte Ireland in a discovery trail through Dublin's city centre, with the focus on the stretch which runs from College Green to Kilmainham.

Transport

Road 
The Liberties is well-connected by road, with a number of primary routes serving the area. The Liffey Quays border The Liberties to the north, while Patrick Street provides the eastern boundary. Cork Street runs through the south of the area, while Thomas Street forms the main thoroughfare through the Liberties.

Dublin Bus run extensive services throughout the Liberties, with Real Time Passenger Information available at a number of stops.

Rail and tram 
While there is no railway station within the Liberties, Heuston Station, one of Ireland's primary transport hubs, is located just to the north. Lines serving Heuston are mainly regional routes. Luas, Dublin Bus, and DublinBikes can be used to get to the Liberties from Heuston Station.

Luas is Dublin's tram system which provides a frequent and reliable service throughout Dublin. The fare paid is based on the number of zones travelled. There are two Luas lines – the Red Line and the Green Line.

The Luas Red Line runs from Tallaght to The Point and from Saggart to Connolly. Stops on this line within the Liberties include Rialto, Fatima and James's. There are also park & ride facilities on the Red Line.

Cycling 
Being such a central area of the city, the Liberties allows for a pleasant cycle to/from any area of the city centre, and biking is highly encouraged. Dublin Bikes terminals within the Liberties include High Street, Francis Street, John Street West, Oliver Bond Street, James Street, Market Street South, and St. James's Hospital. Bicycle lanes are present throughout the Liberties, while rails are placed at strategic locations.

Education 
 National College of Art and Design (Thomas Street)
 British and Irish Modern Music Institute (Francis Street)
 Digital Skills Academy 
 Liberties College

NCAD controversy
In 2006 it was suggested that the National College of Art and Design on Thomas Street be moved to UCD. This provoked controversy with locals and students alike being against such a move. However NCAD passed a resolution that the college would remain. In September 2008, after many years of restorative work, the old Thomas Street Fire Station which is adjacent to the college was unveiled as a new wing of the existing campus.

Notable residents
 The first Baron Ardee, Sir Edward was a Privy Councillor to Queen Elizabeth I and lived in Dublin, probably in Cork St.
 P. J. McCall author of lyrics for "Follow me up to Carlow", "The Boys of Wexford", "Boolavogue and "Kelly the Boy from Killanne" was born and lived all his life in 25 Patrick St. (which was a public house).
 Actor Jeremy Irons and his wife Sinéad Cusack own a home on John Dillon Street near the Iveagh Market.
 Academy Award Winner Brenda Fricker resides in Pimlico.
 W. T. Cosgrave, first president of the Executive Council of the Irish Free State, was born on James's Street.
 Michael Mallin, executed for his part in the Easter Rising
 Revolutionary and trade union activist Lily Kempson. She was the last survivor of the Easter Rising
 Singer Imelda May is from the Liberties area.
 Mark Sheehan of The Script is originally from the James's Street area.
 Comedian Brendan Grace was born in The Liberties

See also
Thomas Street
Cork Street
The Coombe
Liberty of Thomas Court and Donore
Manor of St. Sepulchre
Biddy Mulligan the Pride of the Coombe
Fumbally Lane
Dublin whiskey fire

References
 
 For medieval liberty boundaries see  
  
 also available as a PDF from EPPI at University of Southampton library
  (direct links within the following PDFs: pp.391-396 pp.397-399)

Notes

Towns and villages in Dublin (city)